Ronald Sarre (20 January 1932 – 3 September 2009) was an Australian cricketer. He played fifteen first-class matches for Western Australia between 1951/52 and 1954/55.

See also
 List of Western Australia first-class cricketers

References

External links
 

1932 births
2009 deaths
Australian cricketers
Western Australia cricketers